Guwanç Nurmuhammedov (also spelled Guvanch; born November 17, 1976) is a male judoka from Turkmenistan. He competed in the 2008 Summer Olympics in Beijing, China, and was the flag-bearer for his nation during the opening ceremony of those games.

References

 

1976 births
Living people
Turkmenistan male judoka
Olympic judoka of Turkmenistan
Judoka at the 2008 Summer Olympics
Asian Games medalists in judo
Judoka at the 1998 Asian Games
Judoka at the 2002 Asian Games
Judoka at the 2006 Asian Games
Judoka at the 2010 Asian Games
Asian Games silver medalists for Turkmenistan
Medalists at the 2002 Asian Games